Mundingburra is a suburb of Townsville in the City of Townsville, Queensland, Australia.

Geography 
Mundingburra is predominantly a residential suburb that is situated on the bank of the Ross River, adjacent to the suburb of Aitkenvale. Aplin's Weir crosses the Ross River between Mundingburra and Annandale.

The Electoral district of Mundingburra which the suburb is situated in, is named after the suburb.

History 
Mundingburra State School opened on 22 September 1884.

St Anne’s Church of England Girls’ School opened on 1 January 1917 with an initial enrolment of 71 students at 103 Walker Street in the Townsville CBD (now occupied by the Townsville City Council centre). It was operated by the Society of the Sacred Advent. From 1942 to 1945 during World War II when a Japanese invasion was feared, the school was evacuated to Ravenswood while the Women’s Auxiliary Australian Air Force occupied the school's facilities in Townsville. The Mundingburra site is officially opened on 13 April 1958 with the move to the new site taking place at the end of August 1958. In 1978, the Sisters of the Sacred Advent leave the school, passing control to the Anglican Diocese of Townsville which appoints Neil Tucker as  the school's first lay principal and first male principal. In 1980 the school is fully co-educational and, to reflect this, the school is renamed as The Cathedral School of St Anne & St James (where St James being the name of Townsville's Anglican cathedral).

The Cathedral School of St. Anne & St. James  and celebrated its centenary in 2017.

St Joseph's Catholic School was established in 1924 in Norris Street in Hermit Park by the Sisters of St Joseph of the Sacred Heart. In 1936, the school was relocated to its current site in Mundingburra. The Sisters' involvement with the school ceased at the end of 1991; it now operates with lay staff.

Mundingburra South Special School opened on 1981 and closed on 12 December 1986.

Mundingburra Special School opened on 27 January 1987 and closed in December 2001, to reopen on January 2002 at the same location as Townsville Community Learning Centre as a merger with Aitkenvale Special School in neighbouring Aitkenvale.

Education 

Mundingburra State School is a government primary (Prep-6) school for boys and girls at 77 Ross River Road. In 2017, the school had an enrolment of 688 students with  48 teachers (45 full-time equivalent) and 27 non-teaching staff (18 full-time equivalent). The school has a special education program. The school is adjacent to the Anderson Park, Pimlico.

Townsville Community Learning Centre  is a special-education primary and secondary (Prep-12) school for boys and girls at 78 Thompson Street. In 2017, the school had an enrolment of 174 students with  50 teachers (46 full-time equivalent) and 66 non-teaching staff (44 full-time equivalent).

St Joseph's Catholic School is a Catholic primary (Prep-6) school for boys and girls at 65-75 Ross River Road. In 2017, the school had an enrolment of 381 students with  26 teachers (21 full-time equivalent) and 22 non-teaching staff (14 full-time equivalent).

The Cathedral School of St Anne and St James is a private primary and secondary (Prep-12) Anglican school for boys and girls at 154 Ross River Road.  It also offers Early Childhood and Kindergarten programs and boarding facilities from Year 7 to 12. In 2017, the school had an enrolment of 1,008 students with  93 teachers (89 full-time equivalent) and 93 non-teaching staff (69 full-time equivalent).

There is no government secondary school in Mundingburra. The nearest government secondary school is Pimlico State High School in neighbouring Gulliver to the north-west.

Facilities 
Villa Vincent is an aged care centre at 2 Acacia Street. It is operated by OzCare.

Amenities 
There are a number of parks in the area:

 Anderson Park Botanical Gardens
 Farrar Street Park

 Riverside Park

 Sherriff Park

References

External links

 

Suburbs of Townsville